Epacris apiculata  is a species of flowering plant in the heath family Ericaceae and is endemic to a small area of New South Wales. It is a small, slender, low-lying to erect shrub with hairy branchlets, egg-shaped leaves with a thickened, pointed tip and tube-shaped flowers with white petals.

Description
long.

Taxonomy and naming
Epacris apiculata was first formally described in 1825 by Allan Cunningham in Barron Field's Geographical Memoirs on New South Wales based on plant material he collected on Kings Tableland. The specific epithet (apiculata) means "ending abruptly in a small point".

Distribution and habitat

References 

apiculata
Ericales of Australia
Flora of New South Wales
Plants described in 1825
Taxa named by Allan Cunningham (botanist)